Robert Pugh (born 1950) is a Welsh actor.

Robert Pugh  may also refer to:

 Bob Pugh, Welsh footballer for Newport County
 Robert G. Pugh (1924–2007), attorney in Shreveport, Louisiana
 Robert Pugh (MP), Member of Parliament (MP) for Caernarvonshire
 Robert Pugh (Jesuit) (1610–1679), Welsh Jesuit priest and controversialist
 Robert L. Pugh (born 1931-2013), American diplomat